The Bishop was a British self-propelled gun vehicle based on the Valentine tank and armed with the 25 pounder gun-howitzer, which could fire an   HE shell or an armour-piercing shell. A result of a rushed attempt to create a self-propelled gun, the vehicle had numerous problems, was produced in limited numbers and was soon replaced by better designs.

Design and development
The rapid manoeuvre warfare practiced in the North African Campaign led to a requirement for a self-propelled artillery vehicle armed with the 25-pounder gun-howitzer. In June 1941, the development was entrusted to the Birmingham Railway Carriage and Wagon Company. A prototype was ready for trials by August and  ordered by November 1941. The result was a vehicle with the formal title: "Ordnance QF 25-pdr on Carrier Valentine 25-pdr Mk 1".

The vehicle was based on the Valentine II hull, with the turret replaced by a fixed boxy superstructure with large rear doors. It was nicknamed the "Bishop" for its high mitre-like superstructure.

Into this superstructure the 25-pounder gun-howitzer was fitted. As a consequence of the gun mounting, the resulting vehicle had very high silhouette, which is a disadvantage in desert warfare. By July 1942,  had been built; as the last  being built, an order for a further  placed, with an option for a further  the tender was abandoned in favour of the American M7 105 mm SP howitzer, named "Priest" in British service. Turkey received 48 Bishops in 1943.

Combat history
The Bishop first saw action during the Second Battle of El Alamein in North Africa and remained in service during the early part of the Italian Campaign. Due to its limitations and the Valentine's characteristic slow speed, the Bishop was poorly received. To increase range, crews would build large earthen ramps and run the Bishop onto them, tilting the vehicle back to increase the elevation. The Bishop was replaced by the M7 Priest  and Sexton  when those became available in sufficient numbers and surviving Bishops were diverted for training in self-propelled gun tactics.

British self-propelled guns with ecclesiastical names
A British self-propelled gun armed with the Ordnance QF 25-pounder in design from 1941 was nicknamed "the Bishop" as its appearance was said to resemble a bishop's mitre. A replacement, the US 105 Millimeter Howitzer Motor Carriage M7 was called "Priest" by the British, as part of its superstructure was said to resemble a priest's pulpit. Following this line of names, a 1942 self-propelled gun armed with the 57 mm QF 6 pounder was the Deacon, and a 1943 vehicle with the QF 25-pounder was the Sexton. This practice was continued after the war with FV433 Abbot and ended in 1993 with the introduction of the AS-90.

Notes

Sources
 Chris Henry, Mike Fuller - The 25-pounder Field Gun 1939-72, Osprey Publishing 2002, .

External links
 Flames of War: Bishop, 8th Army
 World War II Vehicles

World War II self-propelled artillery
Self-propelled artillery of the United Kingdom
World War II armoured fighting vehicles of the United Kingdom
Military vehicles introduced from 1940 to 1944
Tracked self-propelled artillery